Invicta is a Latin word meaning invincible, undefeated, or unconquered. It has been used in mottoes like Roma invicta (Latin for "Unconquered Rome"), and it is the motto of the county of Kent, England.

Theories of origin
"Invicta" has been a motto for centuries. Roma invicta is a Latin phrase, meaning "Unconquered Rome", inscribed on a statue in Rome. It was an inspirational motto used until the fall of the Western Roman Empire in 476 AD. This symbolic statement was later printed onto gold coins, to help boost the morale of the failing Empire.

For Kent, it dates back to the invasion of England by William the Conqueror. As the official motto, it appears on the coat of arms of Kent County Council.

Legend has it that, while marching from the 1066 battle site at Hastings, William marched on to London on his way to the (then) capital Winchester. While passing through Kent, the local people picked up branches and marched at William's men. Scared, William and his army took flight and took a different route to London. As the people of Kent felt that they had chased William away, they adopted "Invicta" as a county motto.

A different version of the legend above is depicted on a monument at Swanscombe, where legend states this meeting took place on the Old Roman Road to London (Watling Street). The monument, sculpted by Hilary Stratton and unveiled in 1958, was moved in the early 1960s due to the construction of the A2 dual carriageway. It is now located in the churchyard of St Peter and St Paul's Church in Swanscombe, where the picture (right) was taken.

The monument states that:
Near this spot by ancient tradition the men of Kent and Kentish men carrying boughs on their shoulders and swords in their hands met the invader William Duke of Normandy. They offered peace if he would grant their ancient rights and liberties otherwise war and that most deadly. Their request was granted and from that day the motto of Kent has been INVICTA meaning Unconquered.

Its origin has also been said to have been because Dover was not besieged or defeated on William's march through Kent, but instead agreed to a conditional surrender to him, on its own terms, and was therefore not conquered by him. Holding of land in Kent by gavelkind, rather than the feudal-Norman laws of primogeniture, lasted until the early 20th century suggesting that the people of the county did indeed acquire some concessions from the Conqueror.

Local influences

As the motto of the county, "Invicta" is now a frequently used term within Kent.

Other uses
"Cidade Invicta" ("Unvanquished City") is coined of the city of Porto, Portugal. It was earned during the Napoleonic invasions in the 19th century.

See also
 Roman Empire
 Flag of Kent, sometimes referred to as the "Invicta Flag"
 White horse of Kent, a symbol closely associated with Kent, sometimes referred to as "Invicta"

References

Kent
Latin mottos